Uklonskovite (Na Mg(S O4)F) is a colorless monoclinic mineral found in Chile, Italy and Uzbekistan. It is named after Alexandr Sergeievich Uklonskii (b. 1888), mineralogist, Academy of Sciences, Uzbekistan. Its type locality is Kushkanatau salt deposit, Lower Amu Darya River, Karakalpakstan Respublikasi, Uzbekistan.

References 

Sulfate minerals
Monoclinic minerals
Minerals in space group 11